Cheerful Givers is a 1917 American silent comedy-drama film produced by the Fine Arts Film Company and distributed by Triangle Film Corporation. The film stars Bessie Love and Kenneth Harlan.

The film is presumed lost.

Plot 

In order to save her father's orphanage, Judy (Love) answers a request to have the "eldest boy" work in the kitchen of a rich, miserly woman. She disguises herself as a boy, and, there, she crosses paths with the woman's son Horace (Harlan), whom she mistrusts, but who realizes that she is a girl and who falls in love with her. Judy thwarts the son's plans to steal from his mother's safe. The son realizes his error, and Judy falls in love with him.

Cast

Reception 
The film was generally well-received, called an "adroit comedy" and "perfectly done", and it had a wide appeal. Some reviewers deemed the film "too slow."

It was noted that, although her performance was strong, Bessie Love was not yet fully a box office draw throughout the country.

References

External links 

 
 
 
 
 Lobby poster

1917 comedy-drama films
1917 lost films
1917 films
American black-and-white films
1910s English-language films
American silent feature films
Cross-dressing in American films
Films about orphans
Films directed by Paul Powell (director)
Films shot in Los Angeles
Lost American films
Triangle Film Corporation films
Lost comedy-drama films
1910s American films
Silent American comedy-drama films